Joseph Amberg (1892 – September 30, 1935) was a New York mobster who, with his brothers Hyman and Louis "Pretty" Amberg, was involved in labor racketeering and other criminal activities. During the 1920s and 1930s the brothers competed with rivals such as Jacob "Gurrah" Shapiro, Louis "Lepke" Buchalter, Abe "Kid Twist" Reles and the Shapiro Brothers. On September 30, 1935, Amberg was murdered alongside associate Morris Kessler. The pair were ambushed in a Brownsville, Brooklyn auto repair garage and, after being ordered to line up against the wall, were gunned down by members of Murder, Inc.

References

External links 
 

1892 births
1935 deaths
Criminals from Brooklyn
Date of birth unknown
Deaths by firearm in Brooklyn
Male murder victims
Murdered Jewish American gangsters
People murdered by Murder, Inc.
People murdered in New York City
1935 murders in the United States
20th-century American Jews